John Ferguson McJunkin (September 23, 1830 – January 1, 1883) was an American politician and lawyer.

Born in Washington County, Pennsylvania, McJunkin taught school and studied law. In 1858, he was admitted to the Pennsylvania bar. In 1859, McJunkin moved to Washington, Iowa and continued to practice law. From 1864 to 1868, McJunkin served in the Iowa State Senate and was a Republican. Then from 1877 to 1881, McJunkin served as the Iowa Attorney General. McJunkin died from heart problems at his home in Washington, Iowa.

Notes

1830 births
1883 deaths
People from Washington, Iowa
People from Washington County, Pennsylvania
Educators from Pennsylvania
Pennsylvania lawyers
Iowa lawyers
Republican Party Iowa state senators
Iowa Attorneys General
19th-century American politicians
19th-century American lawyers
19th-century American educators